The match between Pakhtakor and Neftchi in Uzbek League.

History
Since Independence of Uzbekistan matches between the country's most titled football clubs Pakhtakor and Neftchi Ferghana from Fergana city always aroused enormous interest of football fans. The match of two rivals became later O'zbek Classikosi (Uzbek Cyrillic: "Ўзбек классикоси") or "Uzbek El Clasico" by analogy with El Clásico in Spain.

All matches since 1992

Match statistics
Statistics as of 27 November 2017

All time topscorers

Shukhrat Maqsudov is the only player who played and scored for both teams.

All-time most appearances

Pakhtakor

Neftchi

References

Sport in Tashkent
Association football rivalries
Football in Uzbekistan
Pakhtakor Tashkent FK
1992 establishments in Uzbekistan
Nicknamed sporting events